The Ministry of Culture of the Republic of Lithuania is a governmental body of the Republic of Lithuania. Its mission is to formulate and implement state cultural policies supporting professional and amateur art, theatre, music, fine arts, cinema, museums, libraries, and written publications, to guard copyright and copyright-related interests, and to protect cultural values.

The ministry awards prizes including Lithuanian National Prize for Culture and Arts for achievements in the arts and culture, the Martynas Mažvydas Award for scholarly research, National Jonas Basanavičius Award for outstanding achievements related to ethnicity, also awards to young creators, librarians, translators, etc.

The Top Prize of Ministry of Culture of the Republic of Lithuania is the honorary badge “Nešk Savo Šviesą Ir Tikėk”. It is an acknowledgment of many years of work in the field of culture and arts, of creativity and its promotion.

Prizes of the Ministry of Culture for the most significant international awards in the field of culture were launched in 2019. Among the first laureates are the group of opera Sun & Sea (Marina) creators Rugilė Barzdžiukaitė, Vaiva Grainytė, and Lina Lapelytė together with curators Rasa Antanavičiūtė and Lucia Pietrouisti, as well as the group of the documentary Bridges of Time creators and operatic soprano Asmik Grigorian.

Functions
The Ministry of Culture performs the following functions within the framework of Lithuanian legislation: 
 Drafting legislation pertaining to cultural activities;
 Drafting concepts and programs supporting the development of various forms of art, and coordinating their implementation;
 Allocating funds to museums, libraries, and organizations that support visual, musical, and performance arts
 Coordinating activities on behalf of copyright and related rights;
 Coordinating state public information policy;
 Assuring the accounting of, and protection of, cultural values;
 Development and implementing international cultural programs, and drafting international agreements pertaining to these programs;
 Initiating regional cultural development strategies.

Ministers

References

Official website. Retrieved March 23, 2020

 
Lithuania
Culture